Moro War may refer to:

 Moro insurgency in the Philippines (1969–present)
 Moro War for Secession from Philippines (1935–1968)
 Moro–American War (1899–1913)
 Moros during World War II (1941–1945)
 Spanish–Moro conflict (16th century-1904)

See also 
 Moro River Campaign (December 1943)